The Air Force School, Chakeri, Kanpur, India, is located opposite  of Kendriya Vidyalaya No. 2, Chakeri Kanpur and adjacent to the Indian Air Force Senior Commissioned Officers Enclave (popularly called N1).

The school is run under the aegis of IAF Educational and Cultural Society and managed through its School Management Committee composed mainly of the AOC of the Kanpur station, his/her wife or husband in the capacity of AFWWA President and Senior Education Office of Kanpur Station, along with a Senior Medical Officer, a Senior Admin Officer, a Garrison Engineer, an Executive Director, a parents' representative and the Principal as the Secretary to the committee.

History
The school commenced in 1963, it was then called "Modern School." Started as a primary school, it was opened by an Indian Air Force Officer's war widow Ms. V Kohli in a community centre building located at the Indian Air Force Junior Commissioned Officers Enclave.

The school became so busy that it started operating in two shifts, which is still the norm. Soon the Indian Air Force took over the school and the leading lady was offered a position of Vice Principal - Primary Division. The new principal Mr. C Chatterjee was from a boarding school background in eastern India. At this stage (1981) the school moved into the existing building, of which only the L shaped front and central structure was present then. It also upgraded including Higher secondary divisions in 1985, and ultimately senior secondary classes in 1988. Grades XI & XII were initially offered in Science and Commerce streams only. In 2010, the school was awarded ISO 9001:2008 by BSCIC for its Quality Management System.

See also 

No. 1 Air Force School, Gwalior
 Air Force School Coimbatore
 Air Force Bal Bharati School, Lodi Road
 Air Force Golden Jubilee Institute
 The Air Force School (Subroto Park)

References

External links
 Official website

Primary schools in Uttar Pradesh
High schools and secondary schools in Uttar Pradesh
Schools in Kanpur
Educational institutions established in 1954
1954 establishments in Uttar Pradesh